Billa may refer to:

Films 
Billa (1980 film), 1980 Indian Tamil film
Billa (2002 film), 2002 Pakistani Punjabi film
Billa (2007 film), 2007 Indian Tamil film, remake of Billa (1980)
Billa (2009 film), 2009 Indian Telugu film
Billa II, a prequel to Billa (2007)
Billa (2015 film), 2015 Indian Kannada film

People
 Billa Flint (1805–1894), Canadian businessman and politician
 Billa Harrod (1911-2005), British architectural conservationist
 Efstrat Billa (born 1980), Albanian footballer
 Nicole Billa (born 1996), Austrian footballer

Other uses
Bila, Ethiopia, formerly known as Billo and Billa, a village in western Ethiopia
 Billa, Lebanon, a village in the Bsharri District
Billa, townland in the parish of Ballysadare, Co. Sligo, Ireland
Billa (supermarket), a European supermarket chain

See also
Bille (disambiguation)